Eupithecia kurilensis is a moth in the family Geometridae. It is found on the Kamchatka Peninsula and the Kuriles and in Japan.

The wingspan is about 20–25 mm.

Subspecies
Eupithecia kurilensis kurilensis
Eupithecia kurilensis mironovi Beljaev, 2002 (Kamchatka Peninsula)

References

Moths described in 1942
kurilensis
Moths of Asia